Zsófia Gottschall (born 7 April 1978) is a Hungarian biathlete. She competed in two events at the 2006 Winter Olympics. She also competed in the cross-country skiing at the 2002 Winter Olympics.

References

External links
 

1978 births
Living people
Biathletes at the 2006 Winter Olympics
Cross-country skiers at the 2002 Winter Olympics
Hungarian female biathletes
Hungarian female cross-country skiers
Olympic biathletes of Hungary
Olympic cross-country skiers of Hungary
Place of birth missing (living people)
21st-century Hungarian women